Ian Cerro (born December 9, 1996) is an American soccer player who plays for Rio Grande Valley FC in the USL Championship.

Career

Youth and college 
Cerro was born in Florida, but moved to Aurora, Colorado in 2001. Cerro played soccer at Grandview High School where he was chosen as the Rookie of the Year in the Centennial League as a freshman. Cerro also played club soccer with the Colorado Storm Academy, earning a State Championship in 2013. He later spent a season playing soccer with Spanish Segunda División B side Real Juvencia as well as training in Rosario, Argentina.

In 2017, Cerro returned to the United States to attend Southern Illinois University Edwardsville. He made seven appearances for the Cougars across two seasons, with all the appearances coming in his freshman year. He spent time in 2018 playing with USL PDL side Colorado Pride Switchbacks U23, scoring one goal and tallying one assist in 12 matches.

Professional 
2019 saw Cerro sign his first professional contract with Argentinian Primera C Metropolitana side Cañuelas. He returned to the United States in 2021, playing with National Premier Soccer League side FC Milwaukee Torrent  where he was 2021 Midwest Region XI and NPSL National XI. Later in the year, he signed with the National Independent Soccer Association side Chicago House AC. In 2022, he stayed in the NISA with Chattanooga FC, scoring four goals in 24 regular season games.

On January 24, 2023, Cerro signed with USL Championship side Rio Grande Valley FC.

References

External links 
 Ian Cerro - 2017 - Men's Soccer Southern Illinois University Edwardsville bio

1996 births
Living people
American soccer players
Association football midfielders
Chattanooga FC players
National Independent Soccer Association players
National Premier Soccer League players
Primera C Metropolitana players
Rio Grande Valley FC Toros players
SIU Edwardsville Cougars men's soccer players
Soccer players from Colorado
Sportspeople from Aurora, Colorado
USL Championship players
USL League Two players